During the Second World War, the British Army created several field corps; these were formations that controlled multiple divisions in addition to artillery, engineers, and logistical units that would be used to support the divisions as needed. A corps itself was generally under the control of a higher formation such as a field army, an army group or a command. During the war, the British military contained 16 field corps and three that were intended to control anti-aircraft units. The latter were not comparable in role to field corps that were intended to control divisions in combat; anti-aircraft units were assigned to control anti-aircraft formations within a designated area, which could cover hundreds or thousands of square miles. Through deception efforts, a further 11 corps existed within the British military structure. Twenty-seven real or fictitious corps were active during the war, although they did not all exist at the same time and there was overlap between notional and real corps.

In 1939, at the start of the war, the British Army had only one field corps (I Corps); this was quickly followed by two more to help control infantry divisions that were assigned to the British Expeditionary Force (BEF). Within the UK, a further six corps were formed in 1940, and two more were formed in the following years, the last being the I Airborne Corps in December 1943. XIII Corps was formed in 1941, and was the first British corps to be formed outside the UK. Within the British military, corps were commanded by lieutenant-generals.

The size and composition of a corps could vary depending on the mission assigned to it, as well as the tactical and strategic situation. The Western Desert Force, which was formed by re-designating a divisional headquarters, grew to a force of 36,000 men spread over one infantry and one armoured division as well as smaller units. At the start of Operation Epsom, in Normandy in June 1944, VIII Corps was 57,000 men strong; it controlled logistical, administrative, engineer, and artillery assets, two infantry divisions, one armoured division, one armoured brigade, and one tank brigade. During the operation, its strength was increased to 65,000 men. The next major operation in which the corps was involved, Operation Goodwood in Normandy in July 1944, saw a completely different order of battle. It consisted of three armoured divisions, in addition to logistical, administrative, engineer, and artillery forces, with a combined strength of 62,000 men. British army corps did not only just control British forces. On the eve of the Second Battle of El Alamein, the Eighth Army contained three corps and was a multi-national force. XIII Corps contained British and French formations, X Corps contained only British troops, while XXX Corps consisted of Australian, British, Indian, New Zealand, and South African divisions.

Unlike the other corps, the three anti-aircraft corps were static formations that administered the aerial defence of the UK. Each covered a different section of the UK and contained a different number of anti-aircraft divisions; five for I Anti-Aircraft Corps that covered the southern UK, four for II Anti-Aircraft Corps assigned to defend the Midlands, and three for III Anti-Aircraft Corps that administered those in the north. As the war progressed, more resources were allocated to I Anti-Aircraft Corps as it defended vital regions of the country that were vulnerable to Luftwaffe attacks. In October 1942, all three corps were disbanded as part of a reorganization of the UK's aerial defences. The corps and divisions were replaced with seven groups that were intended to ease the command and control of the anti-aircraft formations, save manpower, balance out responsibility, and make the formations more flexible.

Corps

Footnotes

Citations

References

 
 
 
 
 
 
 
 
 
 
 
 
 
 
 
 
 
 
 
 
 
 
 
 
 
 
 
 

 
British corps
Corp World War I
Corps